Ricardo Miró Denis (November 5, 1883 in Panama City, Panama – March 2, 1940), was a Panamanian writer and is considered to be the most noteworthy poet of this country.

He traveled to Bogotá at the age of fifteen to study painting, but was forced to return to Panama in 1899 due to the Thousand Days' War. The magazine Isthmus Herald, where he worked for 10 years, published his first verses.

Miró traveled to Spain between 1908 and 1911 where he had the position of consul in Barcelona.  In 1909 his poem "Patria" (Native Land) was published. His work was characterized as being nostalgic and filled with the author's thoughts about living away from his own native land. In 1917 he returned to Panama to serve as director of the National Archives until 1927, and as a secretary for the Academia Panameña de la Lengua until 1940.

He died on March 2, 1940, in Panama City.

He is the national poet of Panama.

Legacy
A posthumous annual literary prize was named in his honour, the Ricardo Miró National Literary Contest of the Republic of Panama.  The prize was to encourage writers of poetry and fiction in Panama and in 1952 was extended to include works for theater.

In celebration of 100 years since his birth, Miró's completed works were published in two volumes by the National Institute of Culture of Panama.

Personal life
Miró's daughter, Carmen A. Miró, became a noted demographer.

Selected bibliography

Novels and collections
 Preludes (1908)
 Second Preludes (1916)
 The Pacific legend (1919)
 Maria Flower (1922)
 Patriotic verses and scholastic recitals (1925)
 Silent Ways (1929)
 Poetry (collection published 1983)
 Novels and Stories (collection published 1983)

Poems 
 "The Last Seagull" (1905)
 "Native Land" (1909)
 "To Portobello" (1918)
 "Patria" ("Homeland")
 The reincarnation poem (1929)

Notes

References
 
 

1883 births
1940 deaths
Panamanian poets
Panamanian male writers
Male poets
20th-century poets
20th-century male writers